Norbert Szélpál (born 3 March 1996) is a Hungarian football centre-back who plays for OTP Bank Liga club Paksi FC.

Career statistics
.

References

External links
 
 

1996 births
Living people
Hungarian footballers
Hungary youth international footballers
Association football defenders
Békéscsaba 1912 Előre footballers
Paksi FC players
Nemzeti Bajnokság I players
People from Szeged